Timur Khaidarov (born 28 March 1996) is a Kazakhstani canoeist. He competed in the men's C-1 200 metres event at the 2016 Summer Olympics.

References

External links
 

1996 births
Living people
Kazakhstani male canoeists
Olympic canoeists of Kazakhstan
Canoeists at the 2016 Summer Olympics
Sportspeople from Tashkent
Uzbekistani emigrants to Kazakhstan
Asian Games bronze medalists for Kazakhstan
Asian Games medalists in canoeing
Canoeists at the 2018 Asian Games
Medalists at the 2018 Asian Games
21st-century Kazakhstani people